Maureen Fitzgerald is an American soccer player who plays as a midfielder for Portland Thorns FC of the National Women's Soccer League (NWSL).

Club career 
Fitzgerald played for Portland Thorns FC in the 2016 NWSL season. She re-joined the team in 2021 as a National Team Replacement player.

Personal life 
Fitzgerald is a middle school teacher in Portland, Oregon.

References

External links 
 
 Oregon Ducks profile

Living people
Portland Thorns FC players
Year of birth missing (living people)
Boise State Broncos women's soccer players
Oregon Ducks women's soccer players
Soccer players from Oregon
Sportspeople from Beaverton, Oregon
National Women's Soccer League players
American women's soccer players
Women's association football midfielders